This is a list of articles on biophysics.

0–9
5-HT3 receptor

A
ACCN1
ANO1
AP2 adaptor complex
Aaron Klug
Acid-sensing ion channel
Activating function
Active transport
Adolf Eugen Fick
Afterdepolarization
Aggregate modulus
Aharon Katzir
Alan Lloyd Hodgkin
Alexander Rich
Alexander van Oudenaarden
Allan McLeod Cormack
Alpha-3 beta-4 nicotinic receptor
Alpha-4 beta-2 nicotinic receptor
Alpha-7 nicotinic receptor
Alpha helix
Alwyn Jones (biophysicist)
Amoeboid movement
Andreas Mershin
Andrew Huxley
Animal locomotion
Animal locomotion on the water surface
Anita Goel
Antiporter
Aquaporin 2
Aquaporin 3
Aquaporin 4
Archibald Hill
Ariel Fernandez
Arthropod exoskeleton
Arthropod leg
Avery Gilbert

B
BEST2
BK channel
Bacterial outer membrane
Balance (ability)
Bat
Bat wing development
Bert Sakmann
Bestrophin 1
Biased random walk (biochemistry)
Bioelectrochemical reactor
Bioelectrochemistry
Biofilm
Biological material
Biological membrane
Biomechanics
Biomechanics of sprint running
Biophysical Society
Biophysics
Bird flight
Bird migration
Bisindolylmaleimide
Bleb (cell biology)
Boris Pavlovich Belousov
Brian Matthews (biochemist)
Britton Chance
Brush border
Bulk movement

C
CACNA1G
CACNA1H
CACNA1I
CACNA2D1
CACNA2D2
CACNB1
CACNB2
CACNB3
CACNB4
CACNG1
CACNG2
CACNG3
CACNG4
CD22
CD33
CHRNA10
CHRNA2
CHRNA3
CHRNA4
CHRNA5
CHRNA6
CHRNA7
CHRNA9
CHRNB1
CHRNB2
CHRNB3
CHRNB4
CHRND
CHRNE
CHRNG
CLCA1
CLCA2
CLCA3
CLCA4
CLCC1
CLCN1
CLCN2
CLCN3
CLCN4
CLCN5
CLCN6
CLCN7
CLCNKA
CLCNKB
CLIC1
CLIC2
CLIC3
CLIC4
CLIC5
CLIC6
CLNS1A
CLNS1B
CNGB1
Calcium-activated potassium channel
Calcium-activated potassium channel subunit alpha-1
Calcium 2-aminoethylphosphate
Calcium channel
Canadian Society for Biomechanics
Cardiolipin
Carlos Chagas Filho
Carrier protein
CatSper1
CatSper2
CatSper3
CatSper4
Cation channels of sperm
Cav1.1
Cav1.2
Cav1.3
Cav1.4
Cav2.1
Cell adhesion molecule
Cell membrane
Cellular component
Channelome
Channelomics
Channelrhodopsin
Charles Tanford
Chemorepulsion
Chloride channel
Chloroplast membrane
Cholesterol depletion
Cholinergic receptor, nicotinic, alpha 1
Chorioallantoic membrane
Christian B. Anfinsen
Cilium
Climbing
Cometabolism
Comparative foot morphology
Connexon
Core (anatomy)
Countercurrent multiplication
Crenation
Crista
Cyclic nucleotide-gated channel alpha 1
Cyclic nucleotide-gated channel alpha 2
Cyclic nucleotide-gated channel alpha 3
Cyclic nucleotide-gated channel alpha 4
Cyclic nucleotide-gated ion channel
Cyclic nucleotide gated channel beta 3
Cys-loop receptors
Cytolysis

D
David Callaway
David Cohen (physicist)
David E. Goldman
David J. Brenner
David Keynes Hill
David Mervyn Blow
David S. Cafiso
David States
Davydov soliton
Dendrosome
Denny's paradox
Depolarization
Detlev Bronk
Dopamine transporter
Douglas Warrick
Dušan Ristanović
Dynamic similarity (Reynolds and Womersley numbers)

E
Ecomechanics
Efflux (microbiology)
Egg white
Elasticity of cell membranes
Electrochemical gradient
Electromethanogenesis
Electrophysiology
Electrotonic potential
Elizabeth Rhoades
Ena/Vasp homology proteins
Endocytosis
Endomembrane system
Endoskeleton
Enid MacRobbie
Enzymatic biofuel cell
Enzyme kinetics
Ephraim Katzir
Eric Kandel
Erich Sackmann
Erwin Neher
Escheriosome
Eva Nogales
Excitatory amino-acid transporter
Exoskeleton
Extracellular field potential
Extracellular polymeric substance

F
F15845
Filamentous haemagglutinin adhesin
Filopodia
Flagellum
Flapping counter-torque
Flight feather
Flying and gliding animals
Focal adhesion
Footspeed
Force platform
Francis Crick
Frederic M. Richards
Fritz-Albert Popp
Frog battery
Functional movement
Functional spinal unit

G
G. N. Ramachandran
G12/G13 alpha subunits
GABAA receptor
GABRA2
GABRA3
GABRA4
GABRA5
GABRA6
GABRB1
GABRB2
GABRB3
GABRD
GABRE
GABRG1
GABRG2
GABRG3
GABRP
GABRQ
GABRR1
GABRR2
GABRR3
GHK flux equation
GLRA2
GLRA3
GLRA4
GLRB
GLUT1
GLUT8
GPCR oligomer
GRIA1
GRIA2
GRIA3
GRIA4
GRIK1
GRIK2
GRIK3
GRIK4
GRIK5
GRIN1
GRIN2A
GRIN2B
GRIN2C
GRIN2D
GRIN3A
GRIN3B
GRINL1A
GRINL1B
G protein
G protein-coupled inwardly-rectifying potassium channel
G protein-coupled receptor
G protein-gated ion channel
Gamma-aminobutyric acid receptor subunit alpha-1
Ganglion type nicotinic receptor
Gating (electrophysiology)
Geoffrey West
Georg von Békésy
George Karreman
George V. Lauder (biologist)
Gilbert Stead
Gliding motility
Glycerophospholipid
Glycine receptor, alpha 1
Glycophosphatidylinositol
Godfrey Hounsfield
Gopinath Kartha
Gq alpha subunit
Gray's paradox
Ground reaction force
Gs alpha subunit
Gunther O. Hofmann

H
HCN1
HCN2
HCN3
HCN4
HCN channel
HERG
HTR3A
HTR3B
HTR3C
HTR3D
HTR3E
HVCN1
Hal Anger
Hans Frauenfelder
Haptotaxis
Harold J. Morowitz
Harry F. Noller
Henri Atlan
Hermann Joseph Muller
Hermann von Helmholtz
Heterotrimeric G protein
Hill's muscle model
Hille equation
Hodgkin cycle
Hodgkin–Huxley model
Homeoviscous adaptation
Homologous desensitization
Hopanoids
Howard Berg
Hugh Herr
Human leg
Human skeletal changes due to bipedalism
Hydrophobic mismatch
Hydrostatic skeleton
Hyperpolarization (biology)

I
ITPR1
ITPR2
ITPR3
Iatrogenic hypocholesterolemia
Ichiji Tasaki
IgSF CAM
Inner membrane
Inner mitochondrial membrane
Insect wing
Integral membrane protein
Interbilayer forces in membrane fusion
Intracellular membranes
Invadopodia
Inward-rectifier potassium ion channel
Ion channel
Ionotropic effect

J
J. Murdoch Ritchie
Jacques-Arsène d'Arsonval
James D. Watson
Jane S. Richardson
Jeremy C. Smith (scientist)
Jerome Wolken
Johan Paulsson
John C. Taschner
John Desmond Bernal
John Heuser
John Hopfield
John Kendrew
Journal of Applied Biomechanics
Julia Goodfellow

K
KCNA10
KCNA2
KCNA3
KCNA4
KCNA5
KCNA6
KCNA7
KCNAB1
KCNAB2
KCNAB3
KCNB1
KCNB2
KCNC1
KCNC2
KCNC3
KCNC4
KCND1
KCNE1L
KCNE2
KCNE4
KCNF1
KCNG1
KCNG2
KCNG3
KCNG4
KCNH3
KCNH4
KCNH6
KCNH7
KCNH8
KCNIP1
KCNIP4
KCNJ10
KCNJ12
KCNJ13
KCNJ14
KCNJ15
KCNJ16
KCNJ3
KCNJ4
KCNJ5
KCNJ6
KCNJ8
KCNJ9
KCNK1
KCNK10
KCNK12
KCNK13
KCNK15
KCNK16
KCNK17
KCNK18
KCNK2
KCNK3
KCNK4
KCNK5
KCNK6
KCNK7
KCNK9
KCNMB1
KCNMB2
KCNMB3
KCNMB4
KCNN1
KCNN2
KCNN4
KCNQ4
KCNQ5
KCNS1
KCNS2
KCNS3
KCNT1
KCNT2
KCNV1
KCNV2
Kenneth Stewart Cole
Kim Sung-Hou
Kir2.1
Kir2.6
Kir6.2
Kv1.1
KvLQT1
KvLQT2
KvLQT3

L
L-type calcium channel
Lamellar structure
Lamellipodium
Lead (leg)
Lecithin
Lee Spetner
Leslie Barnett
Ligand-gated ion channel
Light-gated ion channel
Lignocellulosic biomass
Limitations of animal running speed
Linus Pauling
Lipid-anchored protein
Lipid bilayer
Lipid bilayer characterization
Lipid bilayer fusion
Lipid bilayer mechanics
Lipid bilayer phase behavior
Lipid raft
Liposome
Liquid ordered phase
List of biophysicists
List of birds by flight speed
List of jumping activities
LocDB
Locomotor activity
Locomotor effects of shoes
Luca Turin
Lymphocyte homing receptor

M
M1 protein
M2 proton channel
MHC class I
Magnesium transporter
Magnetoception
Magnetosome
Magnetospirillum
Magnetotactic bacteria
Magnetotaxis
Manfred Eigen
Marcelo Osvaldo Magnasco
Marche a petit pas
Mario Ageno
Martin Gruebele
Maurice Wilkins
Max Delbrück
Max Perutz
Mechanics of human sexuality
Mechanome
Mechanosensitive channels
Mechanotaxis
Membrane biology
Membrane channel
Membrane contact site
Membrane curvature
Membrane fluidity
Membrane lipids
Membrane nanotube
Membrane potential
Membrane protein
Membrane topology
Membrane transport
Membranome
Mesaxon
Mesosome
Metachronal rhythm
Methylhopane
Microbial ecology
Microbial fuel cell
Microsome
Model lipid bilayer
Moens–Korteweg equation
Mohammad-Nabi Sarbolouki
Molecular motor
Monoamine transporter
Motility
Motor protein
Mucous membrane
Mucous membrane of the soft palate
Muscular hydrostat
Muscular layer
Muscularis mucosae
Myelin-associated glycoprotein
Myelin sheath gap
Myofilament
Mária Telkes

N
N-Acetylgalactosamine
N-Acetylglucosamine
N-Acetylmuramic acid
N-type calcium channel
NMDA receptor
Nanobiomechanics
Nanodisc
Nav1.1
Nav1.2
Nav1.4
Nav1.5
Nectin
Neurophysins
Nicolas Rashevsky
Nicotinic acetylcholine receptor
Niosome
Norepinephrine transporter
Nuclear pore

O
Optical tweezers
Oreste Piro
Origin of avian flight
Osmoregulation
Osmotic pressure
Outer mitochondrial membrane
Outline of biophysics
Overhead throwing motion

P
P-type ATPase
P-type calcium channel
P2RX1
P2RX2
P2RX3
P2RX4
P2RX5
P2RX6
P2RX7
P2X purinoreceptor
P300-CBP coactivator family
PF-4840154
PKD1
PSORT
PSORTdb
PTS1R
Parkinsonian gait
Passive transport
Paul Lauterbur
Paulien Hogeweg
Peptide transporter 1
Peptidoglycan
Peroxisomal targeting signal
Perylene
Peter Mansfield
Petr Paucek
Phosphatidylethanolamine
Phosphatidylglycerol
Phosphatidylinositol
Phosphatidylserine
Physics of skiing
Pink algae
Plasma membrane monoamine transporter
Plasmolysis
Platelet-derived growth factor receptor
Pleuroperitoneal
Podosome
Polar membrane
Porosome
Potassium channel
Prenylation
Preprohormone
Pressure-volume curves
Primary active transport
Protein Analysis Subcellular Localization Prediction
Protein targeting
Protein–lipid interaction
Protomer
Protoplast
Pseudopeptidoglycan
Pseudopodia
Pterygium

Q
Q-type calcium channel

R
R-type calcium channel
ROMK
RYR1
RYR3
Radial spoke
Receptor (biochemistry)
Reinhart Heinrich
Reversal potential
Richard Ernest Kronauer
Robert Corey
Robert G. Shulman
Robert Haynes
Robley C. Williams
Roger Wartell
Roland Benz
Role of skin in locomotion
Rosalind Franklin
Rosalyn Sussman Yalow
Rotating locomotion in living systems
Rudolf Podgornik
Ryanodine receptor 2

S
S-layer
SCN10A
SCN1B
SCN2B
SCN3A
SCN3B
SCN4B
SCN7A
SCN8A
SCNN1A
SCNN1B
SCNN1D
SCNN1G
SIGLEC
SK3
SK channel
Saffman–Delbrück model
Sammy Lee (scientist)
Sarcolemma
Sarcomere
SecY protein
Secondary active transport
Secretory pathway
Semipermeable membrane
Sergei Kovalev
Serotonin transporter
Serous membrane
Sessility (zoology)
Shaker gene
Sialoadhesin
Sidney Altman
Signal patch
Signal peptide
Signal peptide peptidase
Signal recognition particle receptor
Silent synapse
Simon Shnoll
Simtk-opensim
SkQ
Small-conductance mechanosensitive channel
Sodium channel
Soft tissue
Soluble cell adhesion molecules
Solute pumping
Sorting and assembly machinery
Sphingomyelin
Spinal locomotion
Sports biomechanics
Steady state (biochemistry)
Stephen D. Levene
Stretch-activated ion channel
Stroma (fluid)
Structural biology
Structural genomics
Structure validation
Stuart Kauffman
Submucosa
Subserosa
Synthetic ion channels

T
T-tubule
T-type calcium channel
TPCN1
TPCN2
TRPA (channel)
TRPC
TRPC1
TRPC2
TRPC3
TRPC4AP
TRPC5
TRPC6
TRPC7
TRPM
TRPM1
TRPM2
TRPM3
TRPM4
TRPM5
TRPM6
TRPM7
TRPM8
TRPML
TRPN
TRPP
TRPP3
TRPV
TRPV1
TRPV2
TRPV3
TRPV4
TRPV5
TRPV6
Talin protein
Tandem pore domain potassium channel
Tatyana Sapunova
Tetraspanin
Theories of general anaesthetic action
Thomas A. Steitz
Thomas Gold
Thylakoid
Total internal reflection fluorescence microscope
Tradeoffs for locomotion in air and water
Transepithelial potential difference
Transient receptor potential cation channel, member A1
Transient receptor potential channel
Transient receptor potential channel-interacting protein database
Translocon
Transmembrane channels
Treadmilling
Turgor pressure
Twin-arginine translocation pathway
Two-pore channel

U
Undulatory locomotion
Undulipodium

V
VCAM-1
VDAC1
VDAC2
VDAC3
V formation
Venkatraman Ramakrishnan
Vertical clinging and leaping
Vesicle (biology and chemistry)
Voltage-dependent anion channel
Voltage-dependent calcium channel
Voltage-gated ion channel
Voltage-gated potassium channel
Voltage-gated potassium channel database
Voltage-gated proton channel

W
WALP peptide
Walter Kauzmann
Wayne Hendrickson
WeNMR
Whiffling
Wing
Womersley number
Work loop

X
X-ray crystallography
Xiaowei Zhuang

Y
Yadin Dudai

Z
Zinc-activated ion channel
Zinovii Shulman

Biophysics